USS Roberts (DE-749) was a  in service with the United States Navy from 1943 to 1968. She was later sunk as a target in 1971.

History

The ship was named in honor of Arthur John Roberts, Jr. who was killed in the Battle of Tassafaronga, Guadalcanal, 30 November-1 December 1942.  The ship was laid down on 11 February 1943 by the Western Pipe and Steel Company, San Pedro, Los Angeles; launched on 14 November 1943; sponsored by Mrs. Ruth Marohn; and commissioned on 2 September 1944.

Pacific War
 
Following shakedown off southern California, Roberts sailed for Pearl Harbor on 30 November. During January and early February 1945, her group operated to the west, primarily in the Marshalls, then returned to Pearl Harbor. From 1 to 18 March, the group searched, unsuccessfully, between Johnston Island and Kwajalein for an overdue Army Air Corps transport carrying Lt. Gen. M. F. Harmon, USA. Toward the end of the month the ships replenished at Majuro, then resumed HUK operations, this time in the Marshalls.
 
Detached at the end of April, Roberts proceeded to Ulithi, whence she departed on 12 May for Okinawa. Screening  en route, she arrived at mid-month. On the 16th she joined  and screened her until the 31st. On the 31st she escorted , then, on 1 June, departed the Ryūkyūs to escort  to Guam.
 
Into July the group patrolled the shipping lanes of Micronesia, then, toward the end of the month, shifted to the Philippine Sea.
 
In early August Roberts returned to Guam for repairs. On the 15th, hostilities ceased and Roberts was assigned to duty in the western Pacific.
 
During September, she escorted landing craft of the U.S. 5th Fleet's amphibious force from Saipan to Nagasaki; then, in October, screened transports from Luzon to Sasebo. On 18 October, she departed Japan for the United States.

Training ship 
 
The destroyer escort arrived at San Diego, California, on 10 November, then continued on to the Atlantic coast for pre-inactivation overhaul. In January 1946 she moved from Norfolk, Virginia, to Green Cove Springs, Florida, where she joined other ships waiting to berth with the "mothball fleet." In January 1947, however, she was ordered to the 5th Naval District for reserve training duty.

 
On 2 March Roberts arrived at Norfolk and on the 3rd, she was decommissioned and placed "in service, in reserve". For the remainder of the decade she served in that capacity and conducted reserve training cruises along the Atlantic coast and in the Caribbean.
 
In June 1950, war broke out in Korea. On 13 August, Roberts was recommissioned, in reserve, and 1 December she was placed in commission, active. Continuing her training duties, she expanded her operations, including fleet maneuvers on a large scale, in her cruises. In June 1952 she extended her training cruises to the Mediterranean, and, in 1953, she participated in NATO exercises. In the summer of 1954, an extended cruise took her to South American ports, while her two-week cruises ranged from Nova Scotia to Florida, and in the Caribbean.
 
Until October 1961, Roberts continued her reserve training duty. Then, with the Berlin Crisis, the Selected Reserve was called to active duty and Roberts was assigned to the newly formed escort squadron CortRon 12, based at Norfolk. On 1 August 1962, after the release of her reserve crew, she returned to Reserve Destroyer Squadron 34 and resumed Naval Reserve training.

Decommissioning and fate 
 
Decommissioned and placed in service once again on 1 October 1964, Roberts continued her reserve training work, limiting her cruises to weekends and two weeks, until she was placed out of service on 21 September 1968. Her name was struck from the Navy List two days later. She was finally sunk as a target in November 1971.

Awards  
Roberts earned one battle star during World War II.

References

External links

 

Cannon-class destroyer escorts of the United States Navy
Ships built in Los Angeles
1943 ships
World War II frigates and destroyer escorts of the United States
Ships sunk as targets
Maritime incidents in 1971